Gönen is a district of Balıkesir Province of Turkey, in the southern part of Marmara Sea. The town is mostly known for its therapeutic hot springs, leather processing and rice production.

Location
The town is surrounded by Bandırma in the northeast, Biga and Yenice in the west, Marmara Sea and Gulf of Erdek and Balya in the south.

Names and etymology
The oldest known name of the town is Asepsus (Ασεψούς in Ancient greek). This was also the name of the brook, that flows next to the city center and was crossed by the Roman Aesepus Bridge. Research shows that the subsequent name was Artemea (Αρτεμέα), a derivation of the Greek goddess Artemis.

After the Ottoman conquest the name Gönen was used. The etymological source of that name is still disputed. Widely accepted possibilities are:

 Non-Turkish possibilities:
 Ka-wana : A word meaning "Sheepland/Sheep Country"  in Luwian
 Germenon : A word meaning "Hot Spring"
 Giunan : A word meaning "Greek" (Yion in ancient Greek), becoming "Giunen" and then "Gonen" in Turkish
 Possible meanings in Turkish:
 A small pond that dries in summer, small pond, placid water 
 Humid, wet, well-watered.

Also, some sources indicate that there was a nomadic tribe of the "Yörükan community" bearing the name "Gönen","Gönan" or "Gönenlü". The tribe was loosely based around Adana and Maraş.

History
According to Evliya Çelebi's Seyahatname (In which he collected the notes of his journeys), Gönen was used by the governors of Bursa as a summer holiday location, where they enjoyed the therapeutic uses of the hot springs.

On 18 March 1953, Gönen suffered a M7.3 earthquake which left 50 dead in Gönen and hundreds of buildings damaged.  a previous devastating earthquake had occurred here in 1440 AD.

Demographics
According to, the census that took place in 2010, the population is 43,802. This data includes, the town center and nearby villages within the virtual borderline drawn by branches of Gonen Brook. The total population, including Sarıköy and all 89 villages, is 73407. The population distribution is mostly linear, as most villages are located in between the borders of the valley. However, population density noticeably decreases in more steep areas.

Transport

Using available high speed ferry services, it takes 2 hours to reach Istanbul. The only train route available is to İzmir, but this is mostly used for cargo, rather than passenger transportation. Local air service is available through Bursa.  International flights are handled through İstanbul and İzmir.

Notes

External links
 Gönen Kaplıcaları A.Ş. Info about thermal properties of hot springs

Towns in Turkey
Populated places in Balıkesir Province
Spa towns in Turkey
Districts of Balıkesir Province